Obrad Piljak; 1933 – 7 April 2013) was a Bosnian politician and former Chairman of the Presidency of Bosnia and Herzegovina, from April 1989 to December 1990. He was the last nominated (non-elected) member of the Communist party of Bosnia and Herzegovina to serve as Presidency chairman, before the first multi-party elections were held in 1990 and Alija Izetbegović replaced him in his post.

Obrad Piljak was born in 1933 in Petrovo Vrelo, Glamoč. He holds a Ph.D. degree in economics. When not in politics, he was involved with banking and worked at the Central Bank of Bosnia and Herzegovina.

Piljak was on the Advisory Board of the Federal Banking Agency of Bosnia and Herzegovina. He was also an associate professor at the Faculty of economics in the University of Sarajevo. Piljak died in 2013, aged 80.

References

 Countries Ba-Bo. Rulers.org. Accessed 2010-01-21.
 DECISION ON ADMISSIBILITY AND MERITS. HUMAN RIGHTS CHAMBER FOR BOSNIA AND HERZEGOVINA. 2000-06-09. Accessed 2010-01-21.
 CENTRAL BANK OF BH, Volume 4, Issue 6, June 2001. Central Bank of Bosnia and Herzegovina. Accessed 2011-01-21.

1933 births
2013 deaths
People from Glamoč
Serbs of Bosnia and Herzegovina
Yugoslav communists
League of Communists of Bosnia and Herzegovina politicians
Chairmen of the Presidency of Bosnia and Herzegovina